Steve Spence (born May 9, 1962, in Elizabethtown, Pennsylvania) is a United States long-distance runner and coach. One of his many accomplishments was winning a bronze medal at the 1991 World Championships in Athletics. He graduated from Lower Dauphin High School in Hummelstown, Pennsylvania, where he ran track. He then attended Shippensburg University, where he won numerous NCAA Division Two national titles in the 5000m run. Spence is now the head cross country coach and assistant track coach at Shippensburg University.

Achievements

References

In-depth article from MileSplit
Steve Spence's Accomplishments and Coaching Achievements
Shippensburg University Women's Cross Country Program
Shippensburg University Men's Cross Country Program

1962 births
Living people
American male long-distance runners
American male marathon runners
Athletes (track and field) at the 1992 Summer Olympics
Olympic track and field athletes of the United States
People from Elizabethtown, Pennsylvania
Shippensburg University of Pennsylvania alumni
World Athletics Championships medalists
20th-century American people